Ridiaschina is a monotypic moth genus in the family Cecidosidae described by Juan Brèthes in 1916. Its only species, Ridiaschina congregatella, described by the same author one year later, is found in Argentina.

References

Moths described in 1917
Heliozelidae
Moths of South America
Monotypic moth genera
Taxa named by Juan Brèthes